The 1st Infantry Division Artillery (DIVARTY) is the divisional artillery command and force fires headquarters for the 1st Infantry Division at Fort Riley, Kansas. The DIVARTY has served with the division from 1917 to 1939, 1940–1995, 1996–2005, and reactivated in October 2015. The unit has been stationed at Fort Riley, Kansas, and in Germany, and has seen combat in World War I, World War II, the Vietnam War, Operation Desert Storm, and Operation Iraqi Freedom. The DIVARTY provides a single proponent with the division for standardized fires certification and leader development while exemplifying effective mission command, and supporting the seamless cross-attachment of units with common procedures and a shared understanding of the fires warfighting capabilities.

History

World War I
  1st Field Artillery Brigade 
  5th Field Artillery Regiment (155 mm)
  6th Field Artillery Regiment (75 mm)
  7th Field Artillery Regiment (75 mm)
  1st Trench Mortar Battery

Interwar
On 7 October 1920, the 1st Field Artillery Brigade organized under the peacetime TO&E, which included two light (75mm) regiments, and ammunition train of battalion size and a medical detachment.  In 1929, the medium (155mm) regiment returned to the brigade.  Due to budgetary constraints, none of the units were manned or equipped to wartime strength. The 1st Division adopted a new peacetime TO&E in preparation for war on 8 January 1940, which included one light field artillery regiment of three battalions and one medium field artillery regiment of two battalions.  The 1st Infantry Division reorganized again on 1 November 1940 to a new TO&E, which reorganized the Artillery Brigade into a division artillery command led by a brigadier general with one medium and three light field artillery battalions.

World War II
  Headquarters and Headquarters Battery, 1st Infantry Division Artillery 
  5th Field Artillery Battalion (155 mm)
  7th Field Artillery Battalion (105 mm)
  32nd Field Artillery Battalion (105 mm)
  33rd Field Artillery Battalion (105 mm)

Vietnam War 
  Headquarters and Headquarters Battery, 1st Infantry Division Artillery 
  1st Battalion, 5th Field Artillery (105mm)
  8th Battalion, 6th Artillery Regiment (155mm)
  1st Battalion, 7th Field Artillery Battalion (105mm)
  6th Battalion, 15th Artillery Regiment (105mm)
  2nd Battalion, 33rd Artillery Regiment (105mm)
  Battery D, 25th Field Artillery Regiment (Target Acquisition)

Cold War & Gulf War
  Headquarters and Headquarters Battery, 1st Infantry Division Artillery 
  1st Battalion, 5th Field Artillery (155mm)
  2nd Battalion, 5th Field Artillery (155mm)
  4th Battalion, 5th Field Artillery (155mm)
  Battery B, 6th Field Artillery Regiment (MLRS)
  Battery D, 25th Field Artillery Regiment (Target Acquisition)

Global War on Terror
  Headquarters and Headquarters Battery, 1st Infantry Division Artillery 
  1st Battalion, 5th Field Artillery (155mm)
  1st Battalion, 7th Field Artillery Battalion (155mm)

Lineage & honors

Lineage 
 Constituted 24 May 1917 in the Regular Army as Headquarters, 1st Field Artillery Brigade, and assigned to the 1st Expeditionary Division
 Partially organized in June 1917 at Washington, D.C.; organization completed in August 1917 in France
 Disbanded 16 October 1939 at Fort Hoyle, Maryland
 Reconstituted 10 September 1940 in the Regular Army as Headquarters and Headquarters Battery, 1st Division Artillery
 Activated 1 October 1940 at Madison Barracks, New York
 Reorganized and redesignated 15 February 1957 as Headquarters and Headquarters Battery, 1st Infantry Division Artillery
 Inactivated 15 November 1995 at Fort Riley, Kansas
 Activated 16 February 1996 in Germany
 Inactivated 15 February 2006 in Germany
 Activated 17 October 2015 at Fort Riley, Kansas

Campaign credit

Decorations

Distinctive unit insignia

 Description/blazon: A red increscent with the human portion of a centaur issuant with drawn bow and arrow all in gold partially superimposed and between the cusps of the increscent. The insignia is 1 3/32 inches (2.78 cm) in width
 Symbolism: The 1st Field Artillery Brigade had in its organization the 6th and 7th Field Artillery Regiments and the badge consists of a charge from the shield of the coat of arms of the 7th Field Artillery and a portion of the crest of the 6th Field Artillery Regiment, to show the brigade's connection with these units
 Background: The distinctive unit insignia was originally approved for the 1st Field Artillery Brigade on 17 August 1928. It was redesignated for Headquarters and Headquarters Battery, 1st Infantry Division Artillery on 28 December 1954.

References

External links
 Official Unit Home Page
 Official Unit Facebook Page
 1st Infantry Division Unit Facebook Page
 Society of the 1st Infantry Division
  1st Infantry Division Post (Unit Newsletter)

United States Army Division Artilleries
Military units and formations established in 1917